Glorification is the first EP by Swedish black metal band Marduk. It was recorded and mixed at The Abyss in May 1996 and released that September by Osmose Productions.

Track listing

Personnel
Marduk
 Legion – vocals
 Morgan Steinmeyer Håkansson – guitar
 B. War – bass
 Fredrik Andersson – drums

Guest
 Peter Tägtgren – mixing

References

1996 EPs
Marduk (band) EPs
Osmose Productions EPs

ro:Live in Germania